Peter Kennedy (born 3 May 1964) is an Irish sailor. He competed at the 1988 Summer Olympics and the 1992 Summer Olympics.

References

External links
 
 Peter Kennedy at Better Sailing

1964 births
Living people
Irish male sailors (sport)
Olympic sailors of Ireland
Sailors at the 1988 Summer Olympics – Flying Dutchman
Sailors at the 1992 Summer Olympics – Flying Dutchman
Sportspeople from Belfast